The grey-headed goshawk (Accipiter poliocephalus) is a lightly built, medium-sized bird of prey in the family Accipitridae.

Description
The upperparts are grey, paler on the head and neck; the wings are dark; the underparts are mainly white; the cere and legs are red-orange.  The body is 30–38 cm long; females are larger than males. Juveniles have dark brown wings.

Distribution and habitat
The grey-headed goshawk is endemic to New Guinea and adjacent islands.  It has been recorded from Saibai Island, Queensland, an Australian territory in the north-western Torres Strait. It lives in forests, forest edges and secondary growth.

Breeding
This species nests in tall trees on a platform of sticks and leaves.

Feeding
It eats small reptiles and insects.

References

 BirdLife International. (2006). Species factsheet: Accipiter poliocephalus. Downloaded from http://www.birdlife.org on 9/12/2006
 Coates, B.J. (1985), The Birds of Papua New Guinea, Vol. 1, Non-Passerines. Dove: Alderley, Queensland. 
 Morcombe, Michael. (2000). Field Guide to Australian Birds. Steve Parish Publishing: Queensland. 

grey-headed goshawk
Birds of prey of New Guinea
grey-headed goshawk
grey-headed goshawk